The 1903–04 Scottish Cup was the 31st season of Scotland's most prestigious football knockout competition. The cup was won by Celtic when they beat holders Rangers 3–2 in the final at the newly built Hampden Park to claim the trophy for a fourth time. The fixture may have been the point when the 'Old Firm' term began to be used in media to denote the relationship between the clubs, due to the increasing frequency of their meetings and the mutual commercial benefits of the growing rivalry.

Calendar

First round

First round replay

Second round replay

Second round

Second round replay

Quarter-final

Quarter-final replay

Quarter-final second replay

Semi-finals

Final

Teams

See also
1903–04 in Scottish football

References

RSSF Scottish Cup 03-04

Scottish Cup seasons
Cup
1903–04 domestic association football cups